The German television mystery music game show I Can See Your Voice premiered the third season (under its German title ) on RTL, beginning on primetime airings on 24 July 2022, but it was prematurely ended on 7 August 2022, and then returned to late night airings on 20 August 2022, replacing .

Gameplay

Format
Under the original format, the contestants can eliminate one or two mystery singers after each round. The game concludes with the last mystery singer standing which depends on the outcome of a duet performance with a guest artist.

Rewards
The contestants must eliminate one mystery singer at the end of each round, receiving  if they eliminate a bad singer. If the singer is bad, the contestants' winnings are given to the bad singer instead.

Rounds
Each episode presents the guest artist and contestants with eight people whose identities and singing voices are kept concealed until they are eliminated to perform on the "stage of truth" or remain in the end to perform the final duet.

Episodes

Guest artists

Panelists

Reception

Television ratings

Source:

Notes

References

I Can See Your Voice (German game show)
2022 German television seasons